John David Gosch (November 12, 1969 – disappeared September 5, 1982) was a paperboy in West Des Moines, Iowa, who disappeared between 6 and 7 a.m. on September 5, 1982. He is presumed to have been kidnapped.
, there have been no arrests made and the case is now considered cold, but remains open.

His mother, Noreen Gosch, said that Johnny escaped from his captors and visited her with an unidentified man in 1997. She said that her son told her that he had been the victim of a pedophile organization and had been cast aside when he was too old but subsequently feared for his life and lived under an assumed identity, feeling it was not safe to return home. Gosch's father, John, divorced from Noreen since 1993, has publicly stated that he is not sure whether or not such a visit actually occurred. Many have also speculated that the visit did occur, but it was someone else pretending to be Johnny. Authorities have not located Gosch or confirmed Noreen Gosch's account, and his fate continues to be the subject of speculation, conspiracy theories, and dispute.

The case received renewed publicity in 2006 when his mother said she had found photographs on her doorstep depicting Gosch in captivity. Some of the photos received were said to be children from a case in Florida, but one boy in the photos was never identified. Noreen Gosch insists that boy is Johnny.

Gosch's picture was among the first to be featured on milk cartons as part of a campaign to find missing children.

Disappearance
On Sunday, September 5, 1982, in the suburb of West Des Moines, Johnny Gosch left home before dawn to begin his paper route. Although it was customary for Johnny to awaken his father to help with the route, the boy took only the family's miniature dachshund, Gretchen, with him that morning. Other paper carriers for The Des Moines Register would later report having seen Gosch at the paper drop, picking up his newspapers. It was the last sighting of Gosch that can be corroborated by multiple witnesses.

Another paperboy named Mike reported that he observed Gosch talking to a stocky man in a blue two-toned car near the paper drop; another witness, John Rossi, saw the man in the blue car talking to Gosch and "thought something was strange." Gosch told Rossi that the man was asking for directions and asked Rossi to help. Rossi looked at the license plate, but could not recall the plate number. He said, "I keep hoping I'll wake up in the middle of the night and see that number on the license plate as distinctly as night and day, but that hasn't happened." Rossi underwent hypnosis and told police some of the numbers and that the plate was from Warren County, Iowa. According to a private investigator hired by the Gosches, as Johnny walked a block north, where his route started, a paperboy noticed another man following Gosch. A neighbor heard a door slam, and saw a silver Ford Fairmont speed away northwards from where Johnny's wagon was found.

John and Noreen Gosch, Johnny's parents, began receiving phone calls from customers along their son's route, complaining of undelivered papers. John performed a cursory search of the neighborhood around 6 a.m. He immediately found Johnny's wagon full of newspapers two blocks from their home. The Gosches immediately contacted the West Des Moines police department, and reported Johnny's disappearance. Noreen, in her public statements and her book Why Johnny Can't Come Home, has been critical of what she perceives as a slow reaction time from authorities, and of the policy at the time that Gosch could not be classified as a missing person until 72 hours had passed. By her estimation, the police did not arrive to take her report for a full 45 minutes.

Initially, the police came to believe that Gosch was a runaway, but later they changed their statement and suggested that Gosch was kidnapped, but they were unable to establish a viable motive. They turned up little evidence and arrested no suspects in connection with the case.

A few months after his September 1982 disappearance, Noreen Gosch has said her son was spotted in Tulsa, Oklahoma, when a boy yelled to a woman for help before being dragged off by two men.

Over the years, several private investigators have assisted the Gosches with the search for their son. Among them are Jim Rothstein, a retired New York City police detective and Ted Gunderson, a retired chief of the Los Angeles FBI branch.

In 1984, Gosch's photograph appeared alongside that of Juanita Lee Estevez on milk cartons across America; they were the second and third abducted children to have their plights publicized in this way. The first was Etan Patz.

Potentially linked cases 
On August 12, 1984, Eugene Martin, another Des Moines-area paperboy, disappeared under similar circumstances. He disappeared while delivering newspapers on the south side of Des Moines.

Marc James Warren Allen, then 13 years old, told his mother he was going to walk to a friend's house across the street on March 29, 1986, the day before Easter. However, he never made it to the neighbor's house and hasn't been seen since. Allen was first believed to be the third Iowa paperboy to go missing in the 1980s based on earlier media reporting. Allen was not a paperboy in Des Moines, according to a detailed piece about Iowa's missing people that appeared in the Des Moines Register on August 18, 2013. But even now, three decades later, none of the three boys' cases have been solved.

Authorities were unable to prove a connection between the three cases, yet Noreen Gosch says that she was personally informed of the abduction of Eugene Martin a few months in advance by a private investigator who was searching for her son. She was told the kidnapping "would take place the second weekend in August 1984 and it would be a paperboy from the southside of Des Moines."

Fraud by wire case
In 1985, Noreen Gosch received a letter from Robert Herman Meier II, 19, of Saginaw, Michigan. The letter had been signed "Samuel Forbes Dakota". In the letter, Meier stated that he was a guard in a motorcycle club when Gosch's son disappeared in September 1982. According to Meier, Gosch's son was taken as part of a large child-slavery ring operated by the club. According to the FBI, Meier requested from and received $11,000 from the Gosches. Meier additionally requested $100,000 more along with a promise to return their son.

Meier was arrested in Buffalo at the Canadian border by FBI agents, and was later charged with fraud by wire. The letter Meier wrote had stated that Gosch's son was sold to a man whom Meier identified as a "high-level drug dealer residing in Mexico City." Despite the accusation of fraud, Noreen Gosch reportedly believed Meier at his word, and later criticized the FBI, stating that the arrest warrant against Meier destroyed her and her husband John's credibility with anyone who would take the couple's offer to pay ransom for their boy.

Noreen Gosch's account
According to Noreen Gosch, one morning in March 1997 she was awakened around 2:30 a.m. by a knock at her apartment door. Waiting outside was Johnny Gosch, now 27, accompanied by an unidentified man. Gosch said she immediately recognized her son, who opened his shirt to reveal a birthmark on his chest. "We talked about an hour or an hour and a half. He was with another man, but I have no idea who the person was. Johnny would look over to the other person for approval to speak," says Gosch. "He didn't say where he is living or where he was going." In a 2005 interview, Gosch said, "The night that he came here, he was wearing jeans and a shirt and had a coat on because it was March. It was cold and his hair was long; it was shoulder-length and it was straight and dyed black." After the visit, she had the FBI create a picture she says looked like Johnny.

Gosch self-published a book in 2000 titled Why Johnny Can't Come Home. The book presents her understanding of what her son went through, based on the original research of various private investigators and her son's visit.

On September 1, 2006, Gosch reported that she found photographs left at her front door, some of which she posted on her website. One color photo shows three boys bound and gagged. She says that a black-and-white photo appears to show 12-year-old Johnny Gosch with his mouth gagged, his hands and feet tied, and an apparent human brand on his shoulder. A third photo shows a man, possibly dead, who may have something tied around his neck. Mrs. Gosch stated that the man was one of the "perpetrators who molested [my] son". Gosch later said the first two photos had originated on a website featuring child pornography.

On September 13, an anonymous letter was mailed to Des Moines police.

Gentlemen,
Someone has played a reprehensible joke on a grieving mother. The photo in question is not one of her son but of three boys in Tampa, Florida about 1979–80, challenging each other to an escape contest. There was an investigation concerning that picture, made by the Hillsborough County (FL) Sheriff's Office. No charges were filed, and no wrongdoing was established. The lead detective on the case was named Zalva. This allegation should be easy enough to check out.

Nelson Zalva, who worked for the Hillsborough County, Florida Sheriff's Office in the 1970s, said the details of the letter were true and adds that he also investigated the black-and-white in "1978 or 1979", before Gosch's disappearance. "I interviewed the kids, and they said there was no coercion or touching. ... I could never prove a crime," Zalva says. When asked for proof that this was indeed the same photo from the investigation nearly three decades prior, Zalva could not provide any. According to the documentary film Who Took Johnny (2014), only three boys in the pictures were identified by law enforcement, but not the one thought to be Johnny. Noreen Gosch still believes the pictures to be of her son.

In 1989, 21-year-old Paul A. Bonacci told his attorney John DeCamp that he had been abducted into a sex ring with Gosch as a teenager and was forced to participate in Gosch's kidnapping. John DeCamp met with Bonacci and believed he was telling the truth. Noreen later met him and said he told her things "he could know only from talking with her son." He said that Johnny had a birthmark on his chest, a scar on his tongue and a burn scar on his lower leg; although a description of the birthmark had been widely circulated, information about the scars had not been made public. Bonacci also described a stammer that Johnny had when he was upset. The FBI and local police do not believe that Bonacci is a credible witness in the case and have not interviewed him. His siblings told police he was at home when Gosch was abducted.

National interest
The case generated national interest as Noreen Gosch became increasingly vocal about the inadequacy of law enforcement's investigation of missing children cases. She established the Johnny Gosch Foundation in 1982, through which she visited schools and spoke at seminars about the modus operandi of sexual predators. She lobbied for "The Johnny Gosch Bill", state legislation which would mandate an immediate police response to reports of missing children. The bill became law in Iowa in 1984, and similar or identical laws were later passed in Missouri and seven other states.

In August 1984, Noreen Gosch testified in Senate hearings on organized crime, speaking about "organized pedophilia" and its presumed role in her son's abduction. She began receiving death threats. Gosch also testified before the U.S. Department of Justice, which provided $10 million to establish the National Center for Missing and Exploited Children. Gosch was invited to the White House by President Ronald Reagan for the dedication ceremony.

Documentary film
In 2014, a documentary titled Who Took Johnny was released. The film includes interviews with Gosch's parents.

See also 
 List of people who disappeared mysteriously: 1910–1990
 List of people who disappeared mysteriously: post-1990

References

Further reading
 Gosch Noreen N. (November 1, 2000). Why Johnny Can't Come Home. Johnny Gosch Foundation.

External links

 The Johnny Gosch Foundation
 Corbin, Michael. (July 18, 2005). Interview with Noreen Gosch. A Closer Look, show 422 [audio file]. 
 Justice for Johnny Gosch Web site. Wayback Machine. 

1969 births
1980s missing person cases
1982 crimes in the United States
Conspiracy theories in the United States
Incidents of violence against boys
Kidnapped American children
Missing American children
Missing person cases in Iowa
People from Des Moines, Iowa
Possibly living people